West Virginia Route 17 is a north-south state highway located in the southern portion of the U.S. state of West Virginia. The southern terminus of the route is at West Virginia Route 10 in Stollings a short distance east of Logan. The northern terminus is at West Virginia Route 85 in Madison.

History
The current alignment of WV 17 was once part of U.S. Route 119. US 119 was moved off of this routing when Corridor G was complete from Chapmanville to Danville by 1976.  Once that section of four-lane highway was completed, US 119 was realigned to follow WV 10 north from Logan to Chapmanville and then the new Corridor G.

This is the second alignment to carry this number.  The original West Virginia Route 17 followed what is now U.S. Route 35 in Putnam and Mason counties.

Major intersections

Truck WV 17

There is a signed Truck WV 17 at Stollings to bypass a low overhead railroad bridge at WV 17's intersection with WV 10.  The truck bypass follows WV 10 north to the first at-grade railroad crossing, then immediately back on a paralleling route beside the railroad tracks.

References

017
West Virginia Route 017
West Virginia Route 017
017
U.S. Route 35